Giove is a comune in the province of Terni (Umbria, central Italy).

History

The first reference in a historical document which mentions the Castel di Juvo, including its location overlooking the Tiber Valley, dates to 1191. The castle was part of lands fought over by the lords of Alviano and the Roman Catholic Church. In 1481 Pope Sixtus IV gave the fief of to   Lucrezia Appiani of Aragon, widow of  Pino III Ordelaffi.  The castle and lands are purchased by the Farnese family in 1514. They   sell the fief of Giove for 65,000 scudi to  the Mattei brothers Ciriaco and Asdrubale; the transfer was  confirmed by Pope Clement VIII.

In 1643 Pope Urban VIII issued a papal bull recognising Giove as a Duchy of the Mattei, thus making Girolamo Mattei, Duca di Giove.  The arrival of Napoleon's troops in the territory in 1796, led to  Giove becoming part of the Trasimeno department, directly dependent on the imperial government of France. After the fall of Napoleon, Giove returned to  the Papal States and the House of Mattei. It was annexed to the newly formed Kingdom of Italy in 1860.

References

Cities and towns in Umbria